Januna Dam, is an earthfill dam on local river near Barshi Takali, Akola district in the state of Maharashtra in India.

Specifications

Purpose
 Irrigation

See also
 Dams in Maharashtra
 List of reservoirs and dams in India

References

Dams in Akola district
Dams completed in 1978
1978 establishments in Maharashtra